The 2011 WNBA season is the 15th season for the Los Angeles Sparks of the Women's National Basketball Association.

Transactions

WNBA Draft
The following are the Sparks' selections in the 2011 WNBA Draft.

Transaction log
February 1: The Sparks traded Andrea Riley to the Tulsa Shock in exchange for a second-round pick in the 2012 Draft.
February 2: The Sparks signed Ebony Hoffman, LaToya Pringle and Natasha Lacy and re-signed Ticha Penicheiro and Noelle Quinn.
February 3: The Sparks signed Loree Moore.
February 8: The Sparks signed Courtney Paris and re-signed Chanel Mokango.
March 31: The Sparks signed Jenna O'Hea.
May 21: The Sparks waived Chanel Mokango.
May 25: The Sparks waived Loree Moore.
June 1: The Sparks traded Lindsay Wisdom-Hylton to the Chicago Sky in exchange for a second-round pick in the 2012 Draft.
June 2: The Sparks waived Courtney Paris.
July 11: The Sparks announced that Jennifer Gillom was relieved of her head coaching duties. Assistant coach Joe Bryant was named head coach.

Trades

Personnel changes

Additions

Subtractions

Roster

Depth

Season standings

Schedule

Preseason

|- align="center" bgcolor="bbffbb"
| 1 || May 25 || 3:00pm || Seattle || 71-66 || Parker (17) || O'Hea, Lacy (6) || Penicheiro (4) || Torodome  3,212 || 1-0
|- align="center" bgcolor="bbffbb"
| 2 || May 28 || 10:00pm || Phoenix || 83-72 || Milton-Jones (14) || Milton-Jones (6) || Lavender, Penicheiro (4) || The Pit  N/A || 2-0
|-

Regular season

|- align="center" bgcolor="bbffbb"
| 1 || June 3 || 11:00pm || Minnesota || NBATVPRIME || 82-74 || Parker (19) || Parker (10) || Quinn (4) || Staples Center  13,589 || 1-0
|- align="center" bgcolor="ffbbbb"
| 2 || June 5 || 3:30pm || @ Minnesota || PRIMEFS-N || 69-86 || Toliver (13) || Parker (7) || Penicheiro (5) || Target Center  10,123 || 1-1
|- align="center" bgcolor="bbffbb"
| 3 || June 10 || 10:30pm || Phoenix ||  || 98-84 || Parker (22) || Thompson (9) || ParkerPenicheiro (5) || Staples Center  10,616 || 2-1
|- align="center" bgcolor="bbffbb"
| 4 || June 19 || 8:30pm || Seattle || PRIME || 74-50 || Hoffman (12) || Parker (7) || Toliver (5) || Staples Center  9,119 || 3-1 
|- align="center" bgcolor="bbffbb"
| 5 || June 21 || 10:00pm || New York || ESPN2 || 96-91 || Milton-Jones (27) || Parker (13) || Toliver (7) || Staples Center  10,389 || 4-1 
|- align="center" bgcolor="ffbbbb"
| 6 || June 24 || 8:00pm || @ San Antonio ||  || 80-90 (OT) || Parker (25) || Parker (13) || Penicheiro (7) || AT&T Center  8,617 || 4-2 
|- align="center" bgcolor="ffbbbb"
| 7 || June 26 || 4:00pm || @ New York ||  || 67-77 || Parker (16) || Parker (11) || Penicheiro (4) || Prudential Center  7,625 || 4-3 
|- align="center" bgcolor="ffbbbb"
| 8 || June 28 || 8:00pm || @ Connecticut || ESPN2 || 76-79 || Toliver (19) || Thompson (9) || Milton-JonesPenicheiroQuinn (5) || Mohegan Sun Arena  6,515 || 4-4 
|-

|- align="center" bgcolor="ffbbbb"
| 9 || July 5 || 9:00pm || @ Phoenix || ESPN2 || 82-101 || Hoffman (21) || Pringle (9) || Penicheiro (5) || US Airways Center  9,826 || 4-5
|- align="center" bgcolor="ffbbbb"
| 10 || July 9 || 10:00pm || @ Seattle || NBATVKONG || 80-99 || Lavender (21) || Lavender (9) || Toliver (5) || KeyArena  9,686 || 4-6 
|- align="center" bgcolor="bbffbb"
| 11 || July 12 || 8:00pm || @ San Antonio || NBATVPRIMEFS-SW || 84-74 || Penicheiro (18) || LavenderPenicheiro (8) || Toliver (8) || AT&T Center  6,769 || 5-6 
|- align="center" bgcolor="bbffbb"
| 12 || July 15 || 8:00pm || @ Tulsa ||  || 79-74 || Toliver (25) || Milton-Jones (9) || Toliver (6) || BOK Center  5,034 || 6-6 
|- align="center" bgcolor="ffbbbb"
| 13 || July 17 || 8:30pm || Washington || NBATV || 85-89 (OT) || Toliver (21) || Hoffman (7) || Toliver (7) || Staples Center  10,398 || 6-7 
|- align="center" bgcolor="ffbbbb"
| 14 || July 18 || 10:30pm || San Antonio ||  || 69-79 || LacyLavender (14) || O'Hea (11) || Lacy (7) || Staples Center  8,818 || 6-8 
|-
| colspan="11" align="center" valign="middle" | All-Star break
|- align="center" bgcolor="ffbbbb"
| 15 || July 26 || 8:00pm || @ Minnesota ||  || 72-85 || Toliver (28) || Hoffman (9) || LacyPenicheiroQuinn (2) || Target Center  8,044 || 6-9 
|- align="center" bgcolor="ffbbbb"
| 16 || July 28 || 7:00pm || @ Atlanta || NBATVSSO || 80-89 || Hoffman (16) || Hoffman (8) || Penicheiro (11) || Philips Arena  6,701 || 6-10 
|- align="center" bgcolor="bbffbb"
| 17 || July 30 || 8:00pm || @ Chicago || CN100 || 88-84 || Milton-Jones (19) || Lavender (6) || PenicheiroToliver (5) || Allstate Arena  5,909 || 7-10 
|- align="center" bgcolor="ffbbbb"
| 18 || July 31 || 6:00pm || @ Indiana || NBATV || 63-98 || Hoffman (13) || Hoffman (6) || Lacy (4) || Conseco Fieldhouse  9,256 || 7-11 
|-

|- align="center" bgcolor="ffbbbb"
| 19 || August 3 || 3:00pm || Connecticut || NBATV || 70-79 || Milton-Jones (14) || Thompson (8) || Penicheiro (5) || Staples Center  14,266 || 7-12 
|- align="center" bgcolor="ffbbbb"
| 20 || August 7 || 8:30pm || Minnesota || NBATV || 78-84 || Milton-Jones (18) || Lavender (6) || Penicheiro (7) || Staples Center  13,528 || 7-13 
|- align="center" bgcolor="bbffbb"
| 21 || August 9 || 10:30pm || Tulsa || PRIME || 71-66 || Penicheiro (23) || Hoffman (8) || Penicheiro (7) || Staples Center  8,255 || 8-13
|- align="center" bgcolor="bbffbb"
| 22 || August 12 || 10:30pm || Phoenix ||  || 93-90 (OT) || Lavender (25) || Lavender (10) || Milton-JonesPenicheiro (6) || Staples Center  10,512 || 9-13 
|- align="center" bgcolor="ffbbbb"
| 23 || August 16 || 10:30pm || Atlanta || NBATVPRIMESSO || 79-84 || Milton-Jones (19) || Parker (10) || Penicheiro (10) || Staples Center  7,522 || 9-14 
|- align="center" bgcolor="bbffbb"
| 24 || August 18 || 10:30pm || Indiana ||  || 75-70 || Hoffman (21) || Hoffman (7) || Parker (5) || Staples Center  8,102 || 10-14 
|- align="center" bgcolor="ffbbbb"
| 25 || August 20 || 8:00pm || @ Minnesota ||  || 68-87 || Parker (18) || Parker (8) || O'Hea (4) || Target Center  8,816 || 10-15
|- align="center" bgcolor="bbffbb"
| 26 || August 21 || 7:00pm || @ Tulsa ||  || 73-67 || Parker (23) || Parker (9) || Penicheiro (5) || BOK Center  6,012 || 11-15 
|- align="center" bgcolor="bbffbb"
| 27 || August 23 || 7:00pm || @ Washington || CSN-MA || 86-82 (OT) || Parker (19) || Thompson (10) || Penicheiro (6) || Verizon Center  8,441 || 12-15 
|- align="center" bgcolor="ffbbbb"
| 28 || August 26 || 10:30pm || Tulsa || NBATV || 75-77 || Milton-Jones (24) || Milton-Jones (8) || Penicheiro (10) || Staples Center  8,997 || 12-16 
|- align="center" bgcolor="ffbbbb"
| 29 || August 28 || 9:00pm || @ Seattle || ESPN2 || 63-65 || Parker (19) || Parker (14) || Penicheiro (4) || KeyArena  9,686 || 12-17 
|- align="center" bgcolor="bbffbb"
| 30 || August 30 || 10:30pm || Seattle || PRIME || 68-62 || Parker (27) || ParkerThompson (7) || Penicheiro (5) || Staples Center  9,023 || 13-17 
|-

|- align="center" bgcolor="ffbbbb"
| 31 || September 3 || 10:00pm || @ Phoenix || NBATV || 77-93 || Parker (32) || Milton-Jones (8) || PenicheiroToliver (4) || US Airways Center  9,620 || 13-18 
|- align="center" bgcolor="ffbbbb"
| 32 || September 6 || 10:30pm || San Antonio || NBATVPRIMEFS-SW || 65-82 || Thompson (18) || Milton-Jones (8) || Penicheiro (7) || Staples Center  8,502 || 13-19 
|- align="center" bgcolor="bbffbb"
| 33 || September 9 || 10:30pm || Tulsa || NBATV || 84-73 || Lavender (19) || Lavender (12) || Penicheiro (7) || Staples Center  10,299 || 14-19 
|- align="center" bgcolor="bbffbb"
| 34 || September 10 || 10:30pm || Chicago || NBATVCN100 || 74-67 || Milton-Jones (15) || LavenderPringle (6) || Lacy (7) || Staples Center  13,501 || 15-19 
|-

| All games are viewable on WNBA LiveAccess or ESPN3.com

Statistics

Regular season

Awards and honors
Candace Parker was named WNBA Western Conference Player of the Week for the week of August 15, 2011.
Candace Parker was named to the 2011 WNBA All-Star Team as a starter.

References

External links

Los Angeles Sparks seasons
Los Angeles
Los Angeles Sparks